Antonius Andreas (c. 1280 in Tauste, Aragon – 1320) was a Spanish Franciscan theologian, a pupil of Duns Scotus.

He was teaching at the University of Lleida in 1315. He was nicknamed Doctor Dulcifluus, or Doctor Scotellus (applied as well to Peter of Aquila).

His Quaestiones super XII libros Metaphysicae Aristotelis was printed in 1481.

References

Marek Gensler, The making of Doctor Dulcifluus. Antonius Andreae's contribution to the formation of Scotism, Anuari de la Societat Catalana de Filosofia 1996, pp. 57–67.

External links
Franaut page
Marek Gensler, The making of a Doctor Dulcifluus
Against ordination of women

1280s births
1320 deaths
People from Cinco Villas, Aragon
Spanish Franciscans
Scotism
Year of birth unknown
Academic staff of the University of Lleida
14th-century Christian theologians
Medieval Spanish theologians